Main Street station is a SEPTA Regional Rail station in Norristown, Pennsylvania, United States. It serves the Manayunk/Norristown Line. It is one of the two stations on the short electrified branch to Elm Street in Norristown. The station has 76 parking spaces. It is located at Main and Markley Streets. In FY 2013, Main Street station had a weekday average of 189 boardings and 181 alightings.

History
The Stony Creek Railroad completed the Stony Creek Branch from Lansdale to Norristown on December 30, 1873. Its Norristown depot was located at Main and Markley. The connection south to the Norristown Branch opened in 1880. Main Street was also the last Lehigh Valley Transit Company stop on the Liberty Bell Limited (also known as the Liberty Bell High Speed Line) from Allentown to Philadelphia, turning onto Mount Airy Street going towards what is now the Norristown Transportation Center (formerly the Lafayette Street station) and formerly connected with the Norristown High Speed Line.

Station layout

Notes

References

External links
SEPTA – Norristown Main Street Station
Original Norristown Main Street Reading Railroad Station
 Station from Main Street from Google Maps Street View

SEPTA Regional Rail stations
Norristown, Pennsylvania
Former Reading Company stations
Railway stations in Montgomery County, Pennsylvania
Railway stations in the United States opened in 1873